The 2019 Portland Timbers season is the 33rd season in their existence and the 9th season for the Portland Timbers in Major League Soccer (MLS), the top-flight professional soccer league in the United States and Canada. The season covers the period from the end of the Timber's last match in MLS or MLS Playoffs in 2018 (December 8, 2018) to their final match in MLS or MLS Playoffs in 2019 (October 19, 2019).

Background

Season review by month

Off season
On December 10, Zarek Valentin has signed a new contract.

Portland also announced roster moves that include recalling Eryk Williamson's loan from Portuguese first-division side Clube Desportivo Santa Clara. Andy Polo is now under contract with Portland after reaching a performance threshold included in his loan agreement. Portland exercised contract options on goalkeeper Kendall McIntosh, defenders Modou Jadama and Bill Tuiloma, and forwards Jeremy Ebobisse and Foster Langsdorf. Midfielder Cristhian Paredes remains on loan with Portland from Liga MX side Club América.

Portland did not exercise contract options on midfielders Victor Arboleda, Tomás Conechny, Andrés Flores and Lawrence Olum. Goalkeepers Jake Gleeson and Steve Clark are out of contract while defender Roy Miller and midfielder Jack Barmby are also out of contract. Portland announced they are in discussions with Conechny, Florés, and Clark for the upcoming season. Gleeson and Miller will now be available for free agency. Samuel Armenteros' loan will expire on December 31, 2018.

Later on in the day, Portland also announced the signings of Portland Timbers 2 midfielders Marvin Loría and Renzo Zambrano.

Portland released its protected list ahead of the 2018 MLS Expansion Draft. The protected players are Jeff Attinella, Sebastián Blanco, Diego Chara, Jeremy Ebobisse, Marco Farfan, David Guzmán, Foster Langsdorf, Larrys Mabiala, Lucas Melano, Cristhian Paredes, Andy Polo, Diego Valeri, Jorge Villafaña, and Eryk Williamson. FC Cincinnati are allowed to select up to five players from the eligible MLS player pool. Only a single player can be drafted from any one club.

On December 13, former Portland midfielder Ned Grabavoy was appointed to club technical director.

On December 14, Portland passed on round one of the 2018 MLS Re-Entry Draft.

On December 20, forward Jeremy Ebobisse was named to the U.S. Men's National Team roster for January training camp. Later that day, Portland passed on round two of the 2018 MLS Re-Entry Draft.

On December 27, Portland traded right back Alvas Powell to Major League Soccer side FC Cincinnati for $250,000 in General Allocation Money. Portland will also retain a percentage of the international transfer value on Powell.

On January 4, Portland's fixtures for the Mobile Mini Sun Cup preseason was released.

On January 7, MLS released the 2019 schedule for all clubs.

On January 10, center back and former club captain Liam Ridgewell mutually agreed to part ways with the club. He has been with the club since 2014.

On January 11, Portland selected American forward Ryan Sierakowski from Michigan State and German defender Lennart Hein from Saint Louis University in the first two rounds of the 2019 MLS SuperDraft.

On January 14, Portland selected American defender Francesco Moore from Indiana and Venezuelan midfielder David Zalzman from Memphis in the final third and forth rounds of the 2019 MLS SuperDraft.

On January 15, Portland announced their full preseason plans which include trips to Costa Rica and Tucson, Arizona.

On January 16, Portland acquire MLS rights to French defender Claude Dielna from New England Revolution.

On January 18, Portland signed goalkeeper Aljaž Ivačič from Slovenian PrvaLiga side NK Olimpija Ljubljana.

Later that day, it was announced that David Guzmán and [Marvin Loría were called up by Costa Rica for the match against USA on February 2, 2019.

Preseason
On January 21, Portland club players reported in for the start of the 2019 MLS Preseason.

On January 22, Portland Timbers eMLS competitor Edgar Guerrero finished in a tie for fifth on points with a record of 4-3-2 at the 2019 eMLS League Series One held in Los Angeles.

On January 25, Portland announced the re-signing of goalkeeper Steve Clark and midfielder Andrés Flores for the 2019 season. Portland announced that midfielder Tomás Conechny has returned from his loan from Superliga Argentina club San Lorenzo while Eryk Williamson also returned from his loan with Portuguese first-division side C.D. Santa Clara.

On January 29, Portland released their 2019–20 home kit that features ponderosa green and green night hoops with ponderosa green sleeves with native gold and white trims. It is the first time since the 2003 season that the team used a hoop design.

On February 4, Portland played their first preseason match against Deportivo Saprissa and won 4–0. Goals were scored by Dairon Asprilla in the 9th minute, a brace from Lucas Melano in the 32nd and 45+1 minute, and Tomás Conechny in the 61st minute.

On February 7, Portland ended their Costa Rica preseason campaign by defeating C.S. Herediano 3–1. Goals were scored by Lucas Melano in the 31st minute, Andrés Flores in the 60th minute, and Foster Langsdorf in the 69th minute. Portland now travels to Tucson, Arizona to take part in the 2019 Mobile Mini Sun Cup for their final portion of preseason.

On February 13, Portland began renegotiation terms of their deal with NK Olimpija Ljubljana on goalkeeper Aljaž Ivačič, after he was found to have a leg injury.

Later that evening, Portland began their first of three matches in the 2019 Mobile Mini Sun Cup against Seattle Sounders FC. Portland defeated Seattle 2–1 with goals from a successfully converted penalty by Diego Valeri in the 40th minute and the game winner from Jeremy Ebobisse, assisted by Dairon Asprilla in the 88th minute.

On February 15, goalkeeper Aljaž Ivačič underwent successful surgery to repair a left tibial stress fracture. He is expected to return to play in 6–8 weeks.

On February 16, Portland played their second match in the 2019 Mobile Mini Sun Cup against New York Red Bulls. The match ended in a draw with goals from Jeremy Ebobisse, assisted by Sebastián Blanco in the 62nd minute. The final goal was a successfully converted penalty by Diego Valeri in the 90th minute.

On February 17, Portland Timbers eMLS competitor Edgar "RCTID_Thiago" Guerrero finished second overall with a record of 5–1–3 at the 2019 eMLS League Series Two held in Frisco, Texas. Guerrero finished first in the Western Conference and lost in the final versus Philadelphia Union's Cormac "doolsta" Dooley 2–1 in a best of three.

On February 20, Portland signed Paraguayan right back Jorge Moreira on loan from Argentine Primera División side River Plate with purchase option.

Later that evening, Portland played their third match in the 2019 Mobile Mini Sun Cup against Phoenix Rising FC. The match ended in a loss for Portland with a final score of 0–1 and Sebastián Blanco being sent off in the 90th minute.

On February 22, Portland acquired $100,000 in Targeted Allocation Money (TAM) in 2019 and $50,000 in General Allocation Money (GAM) in 2010 to D.C. United for a 2019 international slot.

On February 23, Portland defeated Real Salt Lake 3–0 in their final preseason match in the 2019 Mobile Mini Sun Cup.  Goals were scored by Jeremy Ebobisse in the 5th minute, assisted by Sebastián Blanco, Blanco in the 44th minute, assisted by Diego Valeri and Andy Polo, and Polo in the 72nd minute assisted by Valeri.

March
On March 2, Portland kicked off their 2019 MLS Campaign by traveling to Commerce City, Colorado to take on Colorado Rapids at DICK'S Sporting Goods Park.  The match called for an orange Adidas ball due to the growing amount of snow on the pitch throughout the match.  Goals were scored by Diego Valeri in the 29th minute.  Sebastián Blanco scored in the 45+1 minute, and an own goal from Deklan Wynne would put the Portland up by three; however a late goal from Andre Shinyahiki in the final moments of stoppage time would level Colorado and the match ended in a 3–3 draw.

On March 10, Portland traveled to Los Angeles, California to face Los Angeles FC at Banc of California Stadium.  Diego Chara received two yellows, one in the 35th minute and the other in the 72nd minute which would lead to a red card.  The lone scorer was Jeremy Ebobisse in the 29th minute, assisted by Diego Valeri.  Portland would fall 1–4, making it their only and largest loss of the season so far.

On March 17, Portland traveled to Cincinnati, Ohio to play against FC Cincinnati in their first league game, and their MLS home opener, at Nippert Stadium. Portland without Diego Chara due to a red card last match, ended up getting shutout 0–3 while Larrys Mabiala would be carded twice, sending him off in the 70th minute.

On March 19, Portland midfielders Cristhian Paredes was called up for the Paraguay national team and Andy Polo was called up for the Peru national team.  Additionally, forward Jeremy Ebobisse, defender Marco Farfan and midfielder Eryk Williamson have been named to the U.S. U-23 Men's National Team.

On March 30, Edgar "RCTID_Thiago" Guerrero competed in the 2019 eMLS Cup held at PAX East in Boston, Massachusetts.  Guerrero defeated San Jose Earthquakes Alan "CaliSCG" Ortega with a 3–1 win in the knockout round but fell to FC Dallas' AlanAvi in the 2019 eMLS Cup Western Conference Semifinals with a score of 1–0.

On March 31, Portland traveled to Carson, California to play against LA Galaxy at Dignity Health Sports Park.  Larrys Mabiala was not available due to a red card last match. LA was awarded and successfully converted two penalties, both taken by Zlatan Ibrahimović. Jeremy Ebobisse was the lone scorer, assisted by Diego Valeri and David Guzmán.  Portland ended up losing 2–1.

April
On April 6, Portland traveled to San Jose, California to play San Jose Earthquakes at Avaya Stadium. Diego Valeri attempted to convert an awarded penalty but was unsuccessful from a save from goalkeeper, Daniel Vega. Portland's losing streak continues after a 0–3 defeat, placing them on both the bottom of the Western Conference and Supporters' Shield table.

On April 11, Portland revealed their 2019 Parley kit that will be used during the April 20 match against Columbus Crew SC.

On April 13, Portland traveled to Frisco, Texas to play FC Dallas at Toyota Stadium. Portland was defeated 1–2 with the only goalscorer being Cristhian Paredes, assisted by Sebastián Blanco and Diego Chará.

On April 20, Portland traveled to Columbus, Ohio to play against former Portland head coach Caleb Porter and the Columbus Crew SC at MAPFRE Stadium. After seven matches, Portland finally found their first win of the season with a final score of 3–1. The first goal was scored by Larrys Mabiala, assisted by Diego Valeri. The second goal was scored by Jeremy Ebobisse, assisted by Sebastián Blanco. The final goal was scored by Jorge Moreira, assisted by Sebastián Blanco and Cristhian Paredes.

On April 27, Portland traveled to Toronto, Ontario, Canada to play against Toronto FC at BMO Field. Portland was successful at defeated Toronto with a score of 2–1. The first goal was scored by Bill Tuiloma, assisted by Diego Valeri in the 22nd minute. The second goal scorer was Jeremy Ebobisse, assisted by Sebastián Blanco and Diego Valeri in the 70th minute.

May
On May 2, Bill Tuiloma was awarded goal of the week for week 9.

On May 4, Portland traveled to Sandy, Utah to face Real Salt Lake at Rio Tinto Stadium. Portland defeated Real Salt Lake with a final score of 2–1. Goals were scored by Sebastián Blanco in the 34th minute and the final goal scored by Diego Valeri in the 68th minute. Portland's win streak continues to three matches. Valeri's goal made him the ninth player in MLS to reach 70 goals and 70 assists.

On May 6, Portland traded defensive midfielder David Guzmán to Columbus Crew SC in exchange for a 2019 international roster slot. Shortly after, Portland announced the signing of their new Designated Player, Argentine forward Brian Fernández from Mexican club Necaxa.

On May 11, Portland traveled to Vancouver, B.C. to play their first Cascadia Cup rivalry match of the 2019 campaign against the Vancouver Whitecaps FC. Portland were defeated in a 0–1 shutout, ending their three-match win streak.

On May 15, Portland traveled to Houston, Texas to take on Houston Dynamo.  Portland's newest Designated Player and forward Brian Fernández made his debut and scored within 11 minutes after he subbed.  Portland would settle for a point on the road after a 1–1 draw.

On May 20, midfielder Andrés Flores was announced as a preliminary pick to the El Salvador national team for the 2019 CONCACAF Gold Cup.

On May 21, midfielder Eryk Williamson was announced to the U.S. Senior and U-23 Men's National Team preparation camp from May 26 to June 2 in Annapolis, Maryland.

On May 25, Portland concluded their long away campaign in Chester, Pennsylvania as they defeated Philadelphia Union 3–1.  New striker Brian Fernández made his first start and captured his first brace with goals in the 31st minute assisted by Andy Polo, and the second in the 36th minute with assists from Diego Chara and Diego Valeri.  The final goal was scored by Diego Valeri, assisted by Sebastián Blanco in the 87th minute.  Portland now returns to Providence Park for their home opener of the 2019 MLS campaign on June 1.

On May 30, it was announced that Portland will travel to Tacoma, Washington where they will face Seattle Sounders FC at Cheney Stadium for the fourth round of the 2019 U.S. Open Cup.

June
On June 1, Portland hosted Los Angeles FC in front of a Providence Park record crowd of 25,218 for their home opener for the 2019 season.  Portland was defeated with a score of 2–3.  Goals were scored by Cristhian Paredes in the 46th minute and by Brian Fernández, assisted by Jeremy Ebobisse and Jorge Villafaña in the 84th minute.

On June 7, Portland midfielder Andrés Flores was called up for the El Salvador national team for the 2019 CONCACAF Gold Cup; meanwhile,  midfielder Andy Polo was named to the Peru national team for the 2019 Copa América.

On June 9, Portland left back Marco Farfan and midfielder Eryk Williamson are called up for the U.S. U-23 Men's National Team for a domestic training camp from June 9 through 16 in Herriman, Utah.

On June 12, Portland traveled to Tacoma, Washington to play their first 2019 U.S. Open Cup match against Seattle Sounders FC in the fourth round at Cheney Stadium.  Portland advanced with a 2–1 victory with both goals scored by Brian Fernández, assisted by Diego Valeri, Sebastián Blanco, and Jeremy Ebobisse.

On June 13, it was announced that Portland will host LA Galaxy in the round of 16 in the 2019 U.S. Open Cup.

On June 19, Portland hosted LA Galaxy in the Round of 16 of the 2019 U.S. Open Cup.  Portland advanced with a 4–0 victory, marking their first clean sheet of the 2019 season. Goals were scored by Perry Kitchen (own goal) in the 28th minute, Brian Fernández in the 34th minute, Sebastián Blanco in the 37th Minute, and Jorge Moreira, assisted by Brian Fernández in the 82nd minute.

On June 20, Los Angeles Football Club defeated San Jose Earthquakes 3–1. This result means that Portland will travel to Banc of California Stadium for the quarterfinals of the 2019 U.S. Open Cup on July 10.  Diego Chará was selected by Orlando City SC head coach James O'Connor to participate in the 2019 MLS All-Star game on July 29 against Atlético Madrid.

On June 22, Portland defeated Houston Dynamo at home with a final score of 4–0.  Marvin Loría received his first start with the first team since joining from Portland Timbers 2.  His start was promptly celebrated with Loría being the first goal scorer of the match in the 39th minute, assisted by Jorge Moreira and Diego Valeri.  Valeri would successfully convert an awarded penalty in the 61st minute.  Brian Fernández continued his goal streak by scoring in the 63rd minute, assisted by Diego Valeri.  Finally, Jeremy Ebobisse would be the final scorer in the 75th minute, assisted by Valeri.  Goalkeeper, Steve Clark would receive his second shutout, continuing his two match streak.

On June 24, Diego Valeri, Marvin Loría, and Brian Fernández were announced to Team of the Week: Week 16.  Diego Valeri was announced as the Player of the Week for Week 16.  Diego Chará was selected to the 2019 MLS All-Star Game roster for the match against Atlético Madrid on July 31, 2019.

On June 26, Portland traveled to Saputo Stadium to face Montreal Impact.  With a mixed roster, Portland were defeated 1–2 with the only goal scorer being Tomás Conechny, assisted by Julio Cascante and Marvin Loría.

On June 30, Portland hosted and defeated FC Dallas 1–0.  Brian Fernández set an MLS record with his fifth consecutive league goal.  He scored in the 42nd minute with an assist from Sebastián Blanco.

July
On July 2, Portland announced the multiyear contract extensions of coaching staff members Giovanni Savarese, Carlos Llamosa, Miles Joseph, Guillermo “Memo” Valencia and Shannon Murray.

On July 7, Portland traveled to Yankee Stadium where they defeated New York City FC 1–0.  The lone goalscorer was Sebastián Blanco in the 14th minute.

On July 10, Portland traveled to Los Angeles, California to play against Los Angeles Football Club at Banc of California Stadium for the quarterfinal round of the 2019 U.S. Open Cup.  Portland emerged victorious with a late goal in the 84th minute by Jeremy Ebobisse making the final score 1–0.  Portland will now travel to Allianz Field in St Paul, Minnesota to play Minnesota United FC on August 7.

On July 15, Portland drew Colorado Rapids at home to a final score of 2–2.  Marco Farfan was subbed out early due to an injury in 10th minute, Tommy Smith scored an own goal for the Timbers, Julio Cascante was sent off with a straight red in the 55th minute for a serious foul, and Diego Valeri successfully converted a penalty in the 63rd minute.

On July 16, Portland and Lucas Melano mutually agree to terminate his contract.

On July 18, Portland hosted Orlando City SC to a 1–1 draw.  The lone goal scorer was in the 82nd minute by Jeremy Ebobisse.

On July 21, Portland traveled to CenturyLink Field in Seattle, Washington to face local rival Seattle Sounders FC.  Portland ended Seattle's undefeated home streak with a final score of 2–1, with both goals from Brian Fernández in the 20th and 51st minute.

On July 27, Portland hosted LA Galaxy for the final match of July.  Portland dominated Los Angeles to a 4–0 victory.  Cristhian Paredes captured a brace with goals in the 37th (assisted by: Jorge Moreira and Diego Valeri) and in the 81st minute (assisted by: Jorge Villafaña).  Diego Valeri scored in the 41st minute (assisted by: Sebastián Blanco).  Jeremy Ebobisse scored the final goal in the 88th minute 
(assisted by: Jorge Villafaña and Renzo Zambrano).  Dairon Asprilla was issued a straight red in the 90+4 minute for violent conduct.  LA Galaxy's Efrain Álvarez and Diego Polenta were also issued straight reds for violent conduct.

On July 29, Portland's secondary goalkeeper Jeff Attinella underwent successful surgery to repair anterior labrum tear in right shoulder.  He is placed on the Season-ending injury list.

August
On August 4, Portland traveled to Allianz Field in St. Paul, Minnesota to face Minnesota United FC.  During the final minutes of stoppage time, Minnesota was awarded a penalty after a VAR review citing Larrys Mabiala with a handball in the box.  Minnesota would successfully convert the penalty claiming a late 0–1 victory.  Portland will remain in Minnesota for their semifinal match of the 2019 U.S. Open Cup on Wednesday against the same club.

On August 7, Portland's 2019 U.S. Open Cup run came to an end as they were defeated 2–1 by Minnesota United FC with the lone goal being scored by Brian Fernández (assisted by Jeremy Ebobisse) in the 45+2 minute.

On August 10, Portland hosted Vancouver Whitecaps FC for their third of four Cascadia Cup matches.  Portland defeated the Whitecaps 3–1, placing them currently first in Cascadia Cup standings. Goals were scored by Sebastián Blanco (assisted by: Diego Valeri) in the 28th minute, Marvin Loría (assisted by: Sebastián Blanco) in the 55th minute, and Jeremy Ebobisse (assisted by: Tomás Conechny and Diego Valeri) in the 90th minute.

On August 14, Portland continued their ten home match run as they faced Chicago Fire.  Portland defeated Chicago 3–2 after Fire midfielder Aleksandar Katai was sent off for a high elbow on Julio Cascante in the half hour mark.  The first goal was scored by Jorge Moreira in the 11th minute. Brian Fernández captured a brace with goals in 21st minute (assisted by: Cristhian Paredes and Jorge Moreira) and again in the 88th minute (assisted by: Tomás Conechny and Diego Valeri).

On August 18, Portland was defeated at home to Atlanta United FC to a final score of 0–2.

On August 23, Portland hosted their rivals, Seattle Sounders FC to the final Cascadia Cup regular season meeting of the year.  Portland's supporters, the Timbers Army performed a silent protest until the 33rd minute, showing their upset on the Iron Front ban.  Portland was defeated 1–2 and Seattle won the 2019 Cascadia Cup.  The lone goalscorer was Diego Valeri in the 54th minute.

On August 31, Portland hosted Real Salt Lake to a 1–0 victory.  The lone goalscorer was Diego Valeri (assisted by: Andrés Flores).

September
On September 3, three Portland midfielders were called up for their national teams.  Cristhian Paredes was called up for friendlies with Paraguay against Japan on September 5 and Jordan on September 10. Renzo Zambrano was called up by Venezuela for a friendly against Colombia on September 10.  Andrés Flores was called up by El Salvador for CONCACAF Nations League matches against St. Lucia and the Dominican Republic on September 7 and 10.

On September 7, Portland defeated Sporting Kansas City 2–1 at home with a late stoppage time goal.  The goal scorers were Jeremy Ebobisse in the 83rd minute, and Brian Fernández (assisted By: Diego Valeri and Tomás Conechny) in the 90+4 minute.

On September 15, Portland was defeated at home by D.C. United 0–1. Bill Tuiloma scored an own goal.

On September 18, Portland was defeated at home by New York Red Bulls with a final score of 0–2.

On September 22, Portland drew 0–0 at home against Minnesota United FC.

On September 25, Portland drew 2–2 at home against New England Revolution, ending their ten match home streak.

On September 29, Portland traveled for their final away match to face Kansas City FC. Brian Fernández was sent off in the 36th minute for violent conduct.  The final score was 2–2 with goals scored by Sebastián Blanco in the 29th minute and successfully converted penalty in the 85th minute by Dairon Asprilla.  This draw keeps Portland in the running for the 2019 MLS Cup playoffs; however, they will need a victory or draw for their final match to guarantee a spot.

October
On October 6, Portland hosted and defeated San Jose Earthquakes with a score of 3–1 for their final regular season match, granting them entry into the 2019 MLS Cup Playoffs.  The goal scorers were Larrys Mabiala (assisted by: Jorge Villafaña and Dairon Asprilla) in the 29th minute.  Dairon Asprilla in the 59th minute, and Sebastián Blanco in the 75th minute.  Steve Clark was awarded the Timbers Army player of the year.  Portland will travel to face Real Salt Lake on October 19.

On October 9, two Portland midfielders were called up for their national teams. Cristhian Paredes was called up by Paraguay for friendlies against Serbia on Oct 10 and Slovakia on October 13. Renzo Zambrano was called up by Venezuela for friendlies against Bolivia and Trinidad and Tobago on October 10 and 14.

On October 19, Portland fell 1–2 to Real Salt Lake at Rio Tinto Stadium, thus ending their 2019 MLS campaign.  The lone goalscorer was Dairon Asprilla in the 47th minute (assisted by: Sebastián Blanco).

Team kits
Supplier: Adidas / Sponsor: Alaska Air

Coaching staff and front office

Executive staff

Coaching staff

Stadiums

Squad information

First team

 

 (HG) = Homegrown Player
 (GA) = Generation Adidas Player
 (DP) = Designated Player
 (INT) = Player using International Roster Slot
 (L) = On Loan to the Timbers
 (LO) = Loaned out to another club
 (SEIL) = Season-ending Injury List

Second team

eMLS team

Competitions

Competitions overview
{| class="wikitable" style="text-align: center"
|-
!rowspan=2|Competition
!colspan=8|Record
!Start Round
!First Match
!Last Match
!Final Position (Conference)
|-
!
!
!
!
!
!
!
!
!colspan=4|
|-
| Major League Soccer *

|1
|March 2, 2019
|October 6, 2019
|11th (6th Western)
|-
| MLS Cup Playoffs

|First round
|October 19, 2019
|October 19, 2019
|Round 1
|-
| U.S. Open Cup

|4
|June 12, 2019
|August 7, 2019
|Semifinals
|-
! Total

!colspan=4|

Major League Soccer

Preseason

Costa Rica

Mobile Mini Sun Cup

MLS Regular season

Western Conference

Overall standings

Matches

The 2019 MLS schedule was released on January 7, 2019.

Results by round

Results by location

Cascadia Cup

Standings

Matches

MLS Cup Playoffs

U.S. Open Cup

Player and staff transactions
Per league and club policy, terms of the deals are not disclosed except Targeted Allocation Money, General Allocation Money, draft picks, and international rosters spots.

Transfers in

Loans in

Loans out

Transfers out

Contract extensions

2018 MLS Re-Entry Draft picks

2019 MLS SuperDraft picks

Staff in

Staff out

Staff extensions

National Team participation

2019 MLS All-Star participation

Honors and awards

MLS Player of the Week

MLS Goal of the Week

MLS Team of the Week

Statistics

Appearances and discipline
Numbers in parentheses denote appearances as a substitute.

(T2) = Players called up from Portland Timbers 2 for short-term contracts.

Goalkeeper stats
The list is sorted by total minutes played then by jersey number.

Top scorers
The list is sorted by shirt number when total goals are equal.

Top assists
The list is sorted by shirt number when total assists are equal.

Shutouts
The list is sorted by shirt number when total clean sheets are equal.

Summary

References

Portland Timbers (MLS) seasons
Portland
Portland Timbers
Portland Timbers
Portland Timbers